Nadine Prohaska (born 15 August 1990) is an Austrian football midfielder, currently playing for SC Sand in the Frauen Bundesliga. She previously played for USC Landhaus and SV Neulengbach, and Bayern Munich in the German Bundesliga.

She is a member of the Austrian national team.

Titles
 2 Austrian Leagues (2008, 2009)
 2 Austrian Cups (2008, 2009)
 1 German Bundesliga Cup (2011)

References

External links
 

1990 births
Living people
Austrian women's footballers
Expatriate women's footballers in Germany
FC Bayern Munich (women) players
Austrian expatriate sportspeople in Germany
Austrian expatriate women's footballers
USC Landhaus Wien players
SV Neulengbach (women) players
Austria women's international footballers
Footballers from Vienna
Women's association football midfielders
FSK St. Pölten-Spratzern players
SC Sand players
Frauen-Bundesliga players
ÖFB-Frauenliga players
UEFA Women's Euro 2017 players